The Patient is an American psychological thriller limited series created and written by Joel Fields and Joe Weisberg, who also serve as showrunners and are executive producers along with Chris Long, Caroline Moore, Victor Hsu, and Steve Carell. It premiered on August 30, 2022, on FX on Hulu and concluded on October 25 of that same year, consisting of ten episodes. The series stars Carell, Domhnall Gleeson, and Linda Emond.

Synopsis 
A therapist (Steve Carell) is held captive by a serial killer (Domhnall Gleeson) who seeks help to curb his homicidal urges.

Cast and characters

Main 
 Steve Carell as Alan Strauss, a therapist mourning the recent death of his wife
 Jackson Dollinger as young Alan Strauss
 Domhnall Gleeson as Sam Fortner, a serial killer, new patient of Alan's, and fan of Kenny Chesney. He also works as a restaurant inspector.
 Linda Emond as Candace Fortner, Sam's mother who is aware of the situation

Recurring

 Andrew Leeds as Ezra Strauss, the son of Alan and Beth, estranged after he became an Orthodox Jew
 Laura Niemi as Beth Strauss, the recently deceased wife of Alan who died of cancer and was a beloved cantor at her community's Reform synagogue
 Alan Blumenfeld as Chaim Benjamin
 Alex Rich as Elias, a man held captive by Sam  and the trigger for why Sam sought out Dr. Strauss
 David Alan Grier as Charlie Addison, Alan's former therapist

Episodes

Production

Development 
In October 2021, the series was announced and given a ten-episode order. Steve Carell was set to star and executive produce the limited series. Joel Fields and Joe Weisberg created the show and serve as showrunners, as well as co-write each episode. Caroline Moore, Victor Hsu, and Chris Long are the other executive producers, with Long also directing for the series.

Casting 
Alongside the series announcement, Steve Carell was cast. Domhnall Gleeson, Linda Emond, Laura Niemi, and Andrew Leeds were cast in January 2022. In February 2022, Alex Rich and David Alan Grier were cast in recurring roles.

Filming 
Filming began in mid-January 2022 in Los Angeles.

Reception

Audience viewership 
According to Whip Media, The Patient was the ninth most streamed original series in the United States across all platforms, during the week of September 4, 2022, the sixth during the week of October 9, 2022, the fifth during the week of October 23, 2022, and the third during the week of October 30, 2022. According to the streaming aggregator Reelgood, The Patient was the fourth most watched program across all platforms during the week of September 9, 2022.

Critical response 
On the review aggregation website Rotten Tomatoes, the series holds an approval rating of 88% with an average rating of 7.1/10, based on 57 reviews. The website's critics consensus is, "While The Patient might test viewers' patience by overextending its killer conceit, the arguably career-best work by Domhnall Gleeson and Steve Carell make this therapy session worth eavesdropping on." On Metacritic, which uses a weighted average, the series has received a score of 74 out of 100 based on 30 critic reviews, indicating "generally favorable reviews".

Accolades

References

External links 
 The Patient at FX
 The Patient at Hulu
 

2020s American drama television miniseries
2022 American television series debuts
2022 American television series endings
American thriller television series
English-language television shows
FX on Hulu original programming
Psychological thriller television series
Television shows filmed in Los Angeles